Marios Pourzitidis (born 8 May 1999) is a Greek professional footballer who plays as a centre-back for Czech First League club Slovan Liberec.

Career
On 28 October 2020, Pourzitidis, who played last year at Platanias, will continue his career at Czech club Slovan Liberec, signing a three-years' contract for an undisclosed fee.

References

1999 births
Living people
Greek footballers
Greek expatriate footballers
Super League Greece 2 players
Football League (Greece) players
Platanias F.C. players
Association football defenders
Footballers from Thessaloniki
FC Slovan Liberec players